Kenth Bertil Öhman (born 18 April 1950) is a Swedish sprinter. He was part of the Swedish team that finished seventh in the 4 × 400 metres relay at the 1972 Summer Olympics.

References

1950 births
Living people
Sportspeople from Uppsala
Swedish male sprinters
Swedish male hurdlers
Olympic male sprinters
Olympic athletes of Sweden
Athletes (track and field) at the 1972 Summer Olympics
Japan Championships in Athletics winners
20th-century Swedish people